Nabagram Vidyapith is a boys high school located in Konnagar, Hooghly District, in the state of West Bengal, India. It has produced many notable alumni across various field.

Organisation 

Nabagram Vidyapith was established on 9 January 1948. Located at Konnagar, Hooghly.

This institution is affiliated to the West Bengal Board of Secondary Education. The medium of instruction is Bengali. The current principal of the institution is Dr. Dilip Kumar Mukhopadhyay. The institution presently consists of 1,500 students and 45 teachers.

Alumni Association 
The official alumni association (Nabagram Vidyapith Alumni Association) has been formed in the year of 2018.

Subjects

Higher Secondary
  education
 Commerce

Vocational
 Computer Assembly and Maintenance
 Automobile Mechanics
 Home Science

Notable alumni 

 Goutam Chattopadhyay, Senior Research Scientist, Jet Propulsion Laboratory (NASA)
 বিনোদ ঘোষাল, Writer, Recipient of President's Award.
 Sanjib Bandyopadhyay, Deputy Director General at India Meteorological Department, Calcutta (Alipore Weather Office)
Kaushik Mukhopadhyay, deputy director at Directorate General of Civil Aviation (India)
Amalendu Dasgupta, Director at Development Consultants Private Limited, Kolkata (DC Group)

Gallery

See also
Rishra Brahmananda Keshab Chandra High School
Mahesh Sri Ramkrishna Ashram Vidyalaya (Higher Secondary)
Rishra High School

References

4. https://nbalumni.wordpress.com/

Boys' schools in India
High schools and secondary schools in West Bengal
Schools in Hooghly district
Educational institutions established in 1948
1948 establishments in West Bengal